"The Colorful Character" is a science fiction short story  by American writer L. Sprague de Camp, part of his Viagens Interplanetarias series. It was first published in the magazine Thrilling Wonder Stories in the issue for December, 1949. It first appeared in book form in the collection Sprague de Camp's New Anthology of Science Fiction, published simultaneously in hardcover by Hamilton and in paperback by Panther Books in 1953.

Plot summary
Gregory Lawrence, an ordinary, nondescript scientist, is dismayed to learn that the famous interplanetary explorer Sir Erik Koskelainen has returned to Earth from the planet Krishna in the Tau Ceti star system, and is to stay with the family of Lícia Ferreira, the girl he has been courting. He is convinced that she will lose all interest in him and be smitten by the glamorous star traveler. He is quickly proven correct in his concern; he finds that he himself is not immune to the man's charm, and the whole membership of the Institute of Advanced Study he works for is bowled over as well. The Institute quickly falls in with Koskelainen's proposal to enlist it in a complete biological survey of Krishna's neighboring planet Ganesha, which has never previously been attempted.

Only Reginald Schmidt, Lawrence's own supervisor, remains unconverted, recruiting him in a scheme to overturn the interloper's influence. Critical to the plot is Magramen the Dzleri, a centauroid native of Vishnu, another planet in the Tau Ceti system. At a general gathering of the scientists of the institute, the Vishnuvian, an acquaintance of the explorer, confronts and exposes him as Chabarian bad-Seraz, a humanoid alien from Krishna in disguise; Lawrence, riding on Magramen's back, then overtakes and captures the fleeing imposter. His heroism fails to impress Lícia, however, who was thoroughly taken in by the alien and is angry at Lawrence for overturning her romantic illusions.

It turns out that the whole charade was a plot on behalf of the Krishnan kingdom of Balhib to break the Terran ban on high technology to that primitive world. Schmidt knew this because he himself is the real Erik Koskelainen, on Earth incognito for rest and relaxation in the wake of his interplanetary excursions.

Setting
"The Colorful Character" is set on a future Earth governed by a World Federation in which Brazil has become the paramount great power, with Terran space travel monopolized by a Brazilian-dominated agency called the Viagens Interplanetarias ("Interplanetary Tours" in Portuguese). Interstellar travel is between the Solar System and nearby stellar systems is common, though limited to sub-light speeds, as the author eschews such common science fiction gimmicks as hyperdrives. Most reachable systems have life-bearing planets inhabited by alien races; an Interplanetary Council regulates relations between the various civilizations. Terrans and the reptilian natives of the planet Osiris are the main spacefaring peoples.

The antagonist's native kingdom of Balhib on Krishna is the setting for de Camp's later Krishna novel The Tower of Zanid. Another alien resident at the institute, an unnamed member of Krishna's other intelligent race, the tailed and less human-appearing Koloftuma, may be Yuruzh, the hero of de Camp's later Krishna story The Virgin of Zesh; Yuruzh reveals in that tale that he had been taken to Earth and been a subject of scientific experimentation in his youth.

As dated in the 1959 version of de Camp's essay "The Krishna Stories," the action of "The Colorful Character" takes place in AD 2117, falling between "The Inspector's Teeth" and The Continent Makers, and making it the second Viagens story set on Earth in terms of chronology.

Sources
De Camp, L. Sprague. "The Krishna Stories " (Essay, in New Frontiers, v. 1, no. 1, Dec. 1959, page 6)

External links

1949 short stories
Short stories by L. Sprague de Camp
Works originally published in Wonder Stories
Fiction set around Tau Ceti